The Parvati Temple is a Hindu temple located in Bhubaneswar, Odisha, India.

Location
The temple is located within the Orissa Municipal Corporation Hospital compound, Sriram Nagar, Old Town, Bhubaneswar. The east-facing temple, whose enshrined deity is the Goddess Parvatti, has been operational since construction.

Another significant Hindu place of worship, the Lingaraja temple, is nearby.

Ownership and maintenance
The privately owned temple is maintained and cared for by the Orissa Municipal Corporation Hospital.

History 
Analysis of the materials used to construct the Parvatti temple suggest it was built in the 14th century. Architectural features are typical of South Indian temple complexes constructed in the 14th century.

Architecture 
The Parvatti temple was built in the Kalingan style, with grey sandstone using a dry masonry construction technique.

The temple, which stands on a pista, has a vimana and a front porch. The vimana has typical Dravidian features, including bada, gandi and mastaka. The base of the pabhaga is constructed of five moulds including khura, kumbha, pata, kani and basanta. The gandi has seven receding tiers that are separated by two potalas.  The lower potala has four tiers and the upper potala has three tiers. The raha niches are decorated with talagarbhika of a typical khakhara style, complemented by three plain vertical bands. The tala jangha and upara jangha are decorated with khakhara mundi and pidha mundi.

Significance 
Significant Hindu rituals including Sankranti, Sivaratri, Durgapuja, Kalipuga and Diwali are observed at the temple.

References 

 Dr. Sadasiba Pradhan & Team, Dated on 15.11.2006,Debala Mitra, ‘Bhubaneswar’ New Delhi, 1958, P. 29.
 K.C. Panigrahi, Archaeological Remains at Bhubaneswar, Calcutta, 1961. PP. 16–17.
 L. S.S. O’ Malley, Bengal District Gazetteer Puri, Calcutta 1908, P. 240.
 M.M. Ganguly, Orissa and Her remains, Calcutta, 1912, PP. 393–394.
 P.R. Ramachandra Rao, Bhubaneswar Kalinga Temple Architecture, Hyderabad, 1980, P. 29.
 R.P. Mohapatra, ‘Archaeology in Orissa’. Vol. I, Delhi, 1986. P. 57.
 R.L. Mitra. The Antiauities of Orissa, Vol.II, Calcutta, 1963, PP. 160–161.
 T.E. Donaldson, ‘Hindu Temple Art of Orissa’. Vol. I, Leiden, 1985, P. 76.

External links 
Temples of Orissa
Orissa Tourism

Hindu temples in Bhubaneswar